Kevin Francis Gray (born 1972) is an Irish artist living and working in Canterbury and Pietrasanta, Italy. Hedi Slimane and Howard Bilton are both collectors of his work.

Gray was born in Armagh, Northern Ireland. He studied at the  National College Of Art and Design, Dublin (1995), the School of Art Institute, Chicago (1996), and he completed his MA in Fine Art at Goldsmiths, London (1999).

Gray is a figurative sculptor, who works predominantly with bronze and marble. His work has been shown in London, São Paulo, New York, Berlin, and Rome. He is currently represented by Pace Gallery, London.

Solo exhibitions
2017
Pace Gallery, New York, NY, USA

2013
Pace Gallery. London, UK

2012
Haunch of Venison, New York, NY, USA

2011
Mendes Wood Gallery, São Paulo, Brazil

2010
Changing Role/Move Over Gallery, Rome, Italy

2009
Personal, curated by Martina Cavallarin; Changing Role/Move Over Gallery at Palazzo San Pasquale, Venice, Italy

2007
Goff+Rosenthal, Berlin, Germany

2006
Ringsend, Changing Role/Move Over Gallery, Naples, Italy

2005
Roebling Hall, New York, NY, USA
One in the Other, London, UK

2003
Changing Role/Move Over Gallery, Naples, Italy

2002
One in the Other, London, UK
Osterwalders Art Office, Hamburg, Germany

Selected group exhibitions

2013

Contemporary Silence, LisaBird Gallery, Austria

2011

Roundabout – Tel Aviv Museum of Art, Tel Aviv, Israel
Boundaries Obscured, Haunch of Venison, New York, NY, USA
Apocalypse Now, Nieuw Dakota, Amsterdam

2010

The Franks-Suss Collection – Phillips de Company at The Saatchi Gallery, London, England
FRAGILE : Terres d’empathie, Daejeon Museum of Art, Korea
Emporte-moi / Sweep Me Off My Feet, Museum of Contemporary Art of the Val-de-Marne, Paris, France

2009
  
Emporte-moi / Sweep Me Off My Feet – The Musée National des *Beaux-Arts de Québec, Canada and Museum of Contemporary Art of the Val-de-Marne, Paris, France
Essential Experiences – Palazzo Riso, Museo d’art contemporanea della Sicillia, Palermo
The Figure and Dr Freud – Haunch of Venison, New York, NY, USA
Fragile – Musee d’Art Modern de Saint-Etienne, France

2008 
 
Grotto – Museum 52, London, UK
Et pendant ce temps – Nettie Horn Gallery, London, UK
Micro-narratives – Musée d'Art moderne de Saint- Etienne, Saint-Etienne, France
Gravity – Colección Ernesto Esposito, ARTIUM Centro-Museo Vasco de Arte Contemporáneo, Vitoria-Gasteiz, Spain
Reconstruction – Sudeley Castle, Winchcombe, Gloucestershire, UK

2007

Out of Art, Centre PasquArt, Kunsthaus Centre D'art, Biel, Switzerland
Micro–Narratives, Museum of Contemporary Art, Belgrade, Serbia

2006

Inaugural Exhibition, Goff+Rosenthal, Berlin, Germany
iPod Killed the Radio Star, MAMA Showroom for Video and Media Art, Rotterdam, the Netherlands

2005

Lorand Hegye, P.A.N. Museum, Naples, Italy
The Future Lasts a Long Time, Le Consortium, Dijon, France
Can't You Hear Me Knocking, Roebling Hall, New York

2004

Group Show, Cell Projects, London, UK 
 
2003

Bag Lady, Cell Projects, London, UK
A Pillow For Dreaming, Rossana Chisilie, Turin, Milan, Berlin
From a Bag of Shit to Karma Kola, Osterwalder's Art Office, Hamburg, Germany
Matchine Matchine, 27 Spital Square, London, UK

2002

The Galleries Show, Royal Academy, London, UK
May it Return in Spades, Bart Wells Institute, London, UK
Summer in the city, Osterwalders Art Office, Hamburg, Germany
Guardaroba, Via Venezia, Bari, Italy

2001

The Poster Show, Hoxton Distillery, London, UK 
Record Collection, VTO, London, UK

2000

Art Lab, Mobile Home, London, UK
New Video, Caltech, Los Angeles, CA
Behind the Beginners, Harvard Gallery, Boston, MA
Heterogeneous Loves, CCA, Adelaide, Australia
Harry Pie's Great British Art Show, Stark Gallery, London, UK
It Might be Rubbish but its British Rubbish, Glass Box, Paris, France
Photo15, Art Space NY, NY, New York
Exit, Chisenhale Gallery, London, UK

References

External links
 http://www.kevinfrancisgray.com
 http://www.instagram.com/kevinfrancisgraystudio/
 http://www.pacegallery.com/artists/551/kevin-francis-gray

Irish artists
People from Armagh (city)
Alumni of Goldsmiths, University of London
1972 births
Living people